The 1999 Tehuacán earthquake, or the 1999 Central Mexico earthquake, occurred on June 15 at 15:42 local time (20:42 UTC) near Tehuacán, Puebla, Mexico, close to the state of Oaxaca. The earthquake measured 7.0 on the moment magnitude scale.

Damage
Fourteen people were reported dead, and about 200 injured, many historic buildings and monuments were damaged. 5,306 houses were destroyed, 15,688 partially damaged, and 9,682 slightly damaged. Many houses collapsed in the state of Puebla, including parts of the Puebla City Hall. The state of Puebla was declared a disaster area.

Geology
The Cocos Plate is subducting beneath the North American Plate in the Middle America Trench. This was an intraslab earthquake, and the epicenter had some distance from the Middle American Trench. This was the tenth earthquake since 1864 with magnitude larger than 6.5 and similar location of epicenter.

See also
List of earthquakes in 1999
List of earthquakes in Mexico

References

External links
 Magnitude 7.0 Central Mexico — United States Geological Survey
 

1999 Tehuacán
1999 earthquakes
1999 in Mexico
1999 disasters in Mexico